William Bennett (born 12 April 1948) is a former Australian rules footballer who played for Carlton in the VFL during the 1960s.

A forward from the Victorian town of Maffra, Bennett played 11 games with Carlton which included the 1968 Grand Final. Lining up at centre half-forward, Bennett's side finished victors by three points in what would be his last league game.

External links

Blueseum profile

1948 births
Living people
Carlton Football Club players
Carlton Football Club Premiership players
Maffra Football Club players
Australian rules footballers from Victoria (Australia)
People from Maffra
One-time VFL/AFL Premiership players